The Collector is a 2004 Danish action film directed by Lasse Spang Olsen.

Cast 
 Iben Hjejle - Laura
 Kim Bodnia - Claus
 Ole Ernst - Holger
 René Dif - Omar
 Allan Olsen - Kaje
 Erik Clausen - Harry
 Klaus Bondam - Sune

External links 

Entry in danskefilm

2004 action films
2004 films
Danish action films
2000s Danish-language films